Wulkuraka is a western suburb of Ipswich in the City of Ipswich, Queensland, Australia.

Geography
The Main Line railway enters the suburb from the east (Sadliers Crossing) and exits to the west (Karrabin). The suburb is served by Wulkuraka railway station. To the west of the railway station is the Wulkuraka Maintenance Centre where Queensland Rail maintain their New Generation Rollingstock.

History
The name Wulkuraka is from a Ugarapul word meaning either red flowering gum tree or plenty of kookaburras.

The Brisbane Valley railway line once joined the Main Line railway from the north at Wulkuraka.

Heritage listings 

Wulkuraka has a number of heritage-listed sites, including:
 The Sadliers Crossing Railway Bridge, over the Bremer River between Dixon Street, Wulkuraka, and Tallon Street, Sadliers Crossing
 The Sandstone Railway Culvert

Education
There are no schools in Wulkuraka. The nearest government primary schools are Blair State School in neighbouring Sadliers Crossing to the east and Leichhardt State School in neighbouring Leichhardt to the south-east. The nearest government secondary schools are Ipswich State High School in neighbouring Brassall to the north and Bremer State High School in Ipswich CBD to the south-east.

Amenities 
There are a number of parks in the area:

 Grace Street Reserve
 Gregory Street Reserve 1
 Gregory Street Reserve 2
 Palma Rosa Drive Park
 Toongarra Road Reserve
 Wulkuraka Park

Transport
Wulkuraka Railway Station provides Queensland Rail City network services to Rosewood, Ipswich and Brisbane via Ipswich.

References

External links

 

 
Suburbs of Ipswich, Queensland